The 2022 Wisconsin Badgers football team represented the University of Wisconsin–Madison during the 2022 NCAA Division I FBS football season. The Badgers played their home games at Camp Randall Stadium in Madison, Wisconsin, and competed as members of the Big Ten Conference. They were led by head coach Paul Chryst, who was in his eighth season as head coach, until his dismissal on October 2. Defensive coordinator Jim Leonhard assumed interim head coaching duties after the dismissal of Chryst. The Badgers finished the season 7–6, 4–5 in Big Ten play to finish in fifth place in the West division. They received an invitation to the Guaranteed Rate Bowl where they defeated Oklahoma State.

On November 21, the school named Cincinnati coach Luke Fickell the team's new head coach.

Previous season 
The Badgers finished the 2021 season 9–4, 6–3 in Big Ten play to finish in a three-way tie for second place in the West division. They received an invitation to the Las Vegas Bowl where they defeated Arizona State.

Offseason

2022 NFL draft

Transfers
Outgoing

*Entered NCAA transfer portal midseason or prior to bowl

Incoming

Preseason

Preseason Big Ten poll
Although the Big Ten Conference has not held an official preseason poll since 2010, Cleveland.com has polled sports journalists representing all member schools as a de facto preseason media poll since 2011. For the 2022 poll, Wisconsin was projected to finish first in the West Division.

Personnel

Coaching staff

Roster

Source:

Schedule
Wisconsin announced its 2022 football schedule on January 12, 2022. The 2022 schedule will consist of seven home games and five away games. The Badgers will host Big Ten foes Illinois, Purdue, Maryland, and Minnesota and will travel to Ohio State, Northwestern, Michigan State, Iowa, Nebraska.

The Badgers will host all of the three non-conference opponents, Illinois State from Division I FCS, Washington State from the Pac-12 and New Mexico State from the FBS Independents.

Game summaries

Illinois State

Washington State

New Mexico State

No. 3 Ohio State

Illinois

Northwestern

Michigan State

Purdue

Maryland

Iowa

Nebraska

Minnesota

Oklahoma State (2022 Guaranteed Rate Bowl)

Rankings

Awards and honors

References

Wisconsin
Wisconsin Badgers football seasons
Guaranteed Rate Bowl champion seasons
Wisconsin Badgers football